Rupert Gayle is a Canadian songwriter. He has written for Warner/Chappel and BMG Music Publishing, and is signed to ole.

Written and/or produced work 

Maxi Priest
Mindless Behavior
Shiloh
Shawn Desman
Keshia Chanté
In-Dex
Lenou
Jamelia
Sugar Jones
Alonzo
Massari
Melissa O'Neil
Audrey de Montigny
Dru
Rex Goudie
Kalan Porter
Ryan Malcolm
George
Brian Melo

References 

Canadian pop singers
Canadian male singers
Canadian rhythm and blues musicians
Musicians from Toronto
Living people
Juno Award for R&B/Soul Recording of the Year winners
Year of birth missing (living people)